Merlin and the Sword is a 1985 American made-for-television fantasy adventure sword and sorcery film based on the Arthurian legend. It was released in some regions as Arthur the King.

Plot
A woman falls into an icy cave at Stonehenge and wakes up in Arthurian times. King Arthur's wife is kidnapped by his evil sister Morgan Le Fay. Lancelot is sent out to try and retrieve the lost queen and ends up falling in love with her.

Production 
The movie was originally filmed in 1982 but was unable to secure airtime until April 26, 1985. It became available on disc April 15, 1992.

Cast
 Malcolm McDowell as King Arthur
 Candice Bergen as Morgan Le Fay
 Edward Woodward as Merlin
 Dyan Cannon as Katherine
 Joseph Blatchley as Mordred
 Rupert Everett as Lancelot
 Rosalyn Landor as Guinevere
 Liam Neeson as Grak
 Patrick Ryecart as Gawain
 Philip Sayer as Agravain
 Ann Thornton as Lady Ragnell
 Lucy Gutteridge as Niniane
 Denis Lill as King Pellinore
 Michael Gough as Archbishop

Broadcast history
It was first released in the Philippines on January 5, 1985, followed by a broadcast in the USA on April 26, 1985.

See also
List of films based on Arthurian legend

References

External links

1985 television films
1985 films
1980s fantasy adventure films
Arthurian films
American sword and sorcery films
American fantasy adventure films
CBS network films
Films directed by Clive Donner
Works based on Merlin
1980s English-language films
1980s American films